The Boston College Eagles women's ice hockey program represented Boston College during the 2013–14 NCAA Division I women's ice hockey season. Boston College (BC) has a women's ice hockey team that competes at the Division 1 level. The team is composed of 26 players from all across the United States. Their season runs from September to April, one of the longest sport seasons in college athletics. The team competes in Hockey East, and opposes Boston University, Northeastern University, Providence College, Connecticut University, Vermont Catamounts, the University of Maine and the University of New Hampshire. BC's main inter league rivals are Boston University and Northeastern, two teams that are also located within the city of Boston. BC has advanced to the Frozen Four in the last three consecutive seasons and hopes to do the same this season. Boston College is currently ranked #4 in national polls and #2 in Hockey East polls.

The squad tied the program record for most wins in one season with 27, while their 18-2-1 conference mark was the best in program history. By season’s end, the Eagles had garnered their first-ever regular season title and fifth Beanpot championship. In the postseason, the Eagles were defeated by a 3-1 mark against the eventual national champion Clarkson Golden Knights in the opening round of the NCAA tournament.

Offseason

Recruiting

Exhibition

Beanpot

Postseason

Hockey East

NCAA tournament

Awards and honors
Kristyn Capizzano, Hockey East Rookie of the Week (Week of March 18, 2014)
Emily Pfalzer, All-New England Division I Women's All-Star Team
Haley Skarupa, All-New England Division I Women's All-Star Team

References

External links
 http://www.bceagles.com/sports/w-hockey/bc-w-hockey-body.html
 https://web.archive.org/web/20131029202058/http://www.hockeyeastonline.com/women/bc/index.php

Boston College
Boston College Eagles women's ice hockey seasons
Boston College Eagles women's ice hockey
Bos
Boston College Eagles women's ice hockey season
Boston College Eagles women's ice hockey season
Boston College Eagles women's ice hockey season
Boston College Eagles women's ice hockey season